Cádiz Club de Fútbol is a professional beach soccer team based in Cádiz, Andalusia, Spain. It is a part of the Cádiz CF.

2017 Men's Euro Winners Cup squad

Coach:  Juan Carlos Martin Figuereo

Honours

National competitions
V Campeonato Nacional de Futbol Playa
 Winners:
 2016

External links
 Official Facebook page
 Official Twitter page

Cadiz CF Sotelo
Beach soccer in Spain